On May 10, 2011, the 2011 North Miami mayoral election took place. This election was officially nonpartisan, although all candidates were Democrats. Andre Pierre narrowly won reelection, defeating Carol F. Keys and Jacques Despinosse.

Candidates
Andre Pierre 

Carol F. Keys

Jacques Despinosse

Results

References

2011
2011 United States mayoral elections
2011 Florida elections
May 2011 events in the United States